Angela Joy Richardson (born 21 October 1974) is a British Conservative Party politician, who has served as the Member of Parliament (MP) for Guildford since the 2019 general election.

Political career 
In May 2019, Richardson stood for election to Waverley Borough Council in the ward of Cranleigh East, but failed to win a seat after she was pushed into fifth place by three Liberal Democrats and a Conservative candidate. She was elected to Cranleigh Parish Council later the same month.

Following incumbent MP Anne Milton's resignation from the Conservative Party in opposition to the Brexit policies of Prime Minister Boris Johnson, Richardson was selected as the party's candidate for the Guildford constituency. She was elected at the 2019 general election, defeating Milton, who contested the election as an independent candidate. She was sworn into the House of Commons on 18 December 2019.

She was also elected as a vice-chair of the APPG for Australia and New Zealand.

Richardson served as a Parliamentary Private Secretary (PPS) to the ministerial team at the Department for Education, and following this, to Levelling Up Secretary Michael Gove.  On 3 November 2021, she was fired from her PPS role after abstaining on a government-backed amendment to overhaul the Commons' disciplinary process in response to the proposed suspension of Owen Paterson. She was reinstated to her PPS role the following day. She ultimately resigned as PPS in January 2022, with her resignation made public after the publication on 31 January of Sue Gray's report on breaches of lockdown restrictions in Downing Street.

Personal life 
Richardson was born in West Auckland, New Zealand. She previously worked briefly in the City of London in investment banking operations. She has three children. Richardson lives in Ewhurst, Surrey, in her constituency.

References

External links

Living people
UK MPs 2019–present
Conservative Party (UK) MPs for English constituencies
21st-century British women politicians
1974 births
British investment bankers
British women bankers
Female members of the Parliament of the United Kingdom for English constituencies
Members of the Parliament of the United Kingdom for Guildford
New Zealand bankers
New Zealand emigrants to the United Kingdom
Politicians from Auckland
Politics of Guildford
21st-century New Zealand women politicians
21st-century New Zealand politicians